Suzan or Soozan may refer to:
 Suzan, Hamadan
 Suzan, Kerman
 Suzan, Lorestan
 Suzan, Markazi
 Suzan, Thompson